James Johnston (born 26 November 1990) is an Australian singer. In 2009, Johnston placed third in the seventh and final season of Australian Idol. In 2014, he made the top 24 of the sixth season of The X Factor (Australia).

In July 2021, Johnston released his debut single "Raised Like That". It became the fastest ever debut single by an Australian-based country artist to reach 1 million streams. "Raised Like That" was certified gold in Australia by mid-2022, and in doing so, Johnston became first independent country artist to achieve the milestone in 21 years.

Early life
James Johnston was born on 26 November 1990 in Wingham, New South Wales. Johnston spent his early years travelling farm-to-farm with his dad, selling and servicing tractors and was introduced to artists like Johnny Cash, Waylon Jennings and Garth Brooks from an early age. Johnston performed for the first time at four years of age, singing "Friends in Low Places" in front of his kindergarten class.

Throughout his teens, Johnston busked on the streets of Tamworth and performed in various bands and on many stages.

He was a part of the Star Struck school spectacular event in Newcastle, NSW in 2005.

Career

2009: Australian Idol

In 2009, Johnston auditioned for the seventh season of Australian Idol, singing John Mayer's "Your Body Is a Wonderland" at his audition, receiving praise from all four judges. Johnston eventually placed third behind Stan Walker and Hayley Warner.

Following his Idol experience, Johnston bought a van and travelled around country Australia, living show-to-show for a number of years.

2014: X Factor

In 2014, Johnston auditioned for the sixth season of The X Factor (Australian TV series). He made the top 24, but was eliminated before making the live shows.

Following The X Factor, Johnston travelled through Nashville, Tennessee with a friend. Johnston told Country Town in November 2021, "We were staying in this hostel that had this old piano. Everyone would go to bed at one o'clock in the morning, and I just stayed there for three or four hours writing songs … I've never been so inspired to create and truly, from that moment on, I was like, 'country music, that's where my heart', just songwriting and telling stories."

2020-present: "Raised Like That" and "Small Town"
In eighteen months between 2020 and 2021, Johnston wrote over 200 songs. On 9 July 2021, Johnston released his debut single "Raised Like That" which tells the story of community, integrity, and a celebration to a way of life of people who grew up in a small close knit community.

On 21 July 2021, Johnston reached out for his social community to create a video showing themselves "Raised Like That". Johnston personally edited the video and released it on 1 September 2021. In October 2021, the song peaked at number 1 on the Countrytown Music Network Hot 50 Country Airplay Chart and number 4 on the Australian Independent chart. It was certified gold by the Australian Recording Industry Association (ARIA) in 2022.

Johnston released his second single "Small Town" on 19 November 2021. On the writing of the song, Johnston said "I wrote 'Small Town' on the drive back home to my hometown of Wingham. I had been spending quite some time in the city and I was just so excited to get back to my family farm. I wanted to capture that feeling of excitement and anticipation in the song – that build up as I was on that drive to get back home."

Style
In November 2021, Johnston said "I grew up singing country music up until about 16. But I feel I truly developed my style when I went off and tried lots of different genres (played in a funk band, wrote indie acoustic music, played rock 'n' roll covers). So when I finally came home to country at about 25, my upbringing was rooted in country music and songwriting but I got to pull from all different genres to craft my own unique sound."

In November 2021, Johnston further elaborated with Country Town saying "When I did Idol and The X Factor, I always felt like I was kind of playing a character of sorts and it felt so disingenuous. I was young when I did Australian Idol. I didn't know myself, and I would never have called myself an artist at that stage. I was a singer that loved to sing songs. So, for me, I didn’t mind getting pushed and pulled in different directions."

Discography

Singles

Awards and nominations

Country Music Awards of Australia
The Country Music Awards of Australia is an annual awards night held in January during the Tamworth Country Music Festival. Celebrating recording excellence in the Australian country music industry. They commenced in 1973.
 

! 
|-
|rowspan="6"| 2023 ||  "Small Town" || Single of the Year ||  ||rowspan="6"| 
|-
| "Small Town" || Song of the Year || 
|-
| "Small Town" (Directed by Elijah Cavanagh) || Video of the Year || 
|-
| "Same Songs" (with Kaylee Bell) || Vocal Collaboration of the Year || 
|-
|rowspan="2"| James Johnston || New Talent of the Year || 
|-
| Male Artist of the Year ||

Rolling Stone Australia Awards
The Rolling Stone Australia Awards are awarded annually in January or February by the Australian edition of Rolling Stone magazine for outstanding contributions to popular culture in the previous year.

! 
|-
| 2023
| James Johnston
| Best New Artist
| 
| 
|-

References

1990 births
Living people
Musicians from New South Wales
Australian male singers
Australian songwriters
Australian country singers
Australian Idol participants
The X Factor (Australian TV series) contestants